The Middle Dnieper culture is a formative early expression of the Corded Ware culture, ca. 3200—2300 BC, of northern Ukraine and Belarus.

Distribution
As the name indicates, it was centered on the middle reach of the Dnieper River and is contemporaneous with the latter phase and then a successor to the Indo-European Yamnaya culture, as well as to the latter phase of the Tripolye culture.

Geographically, the Middle Dnieper culture is directly behind the area occupied by the Globular Amphora culture (south and east), and while commencing a little later and lasting a little longer, it is otherwise contemporaneous with it.

The Fatyanovo–Balanovo culture is, in turn, considered an eastern extension of the Middle Dnieper culture.

Characteristics
More than 200 sites are attested to, mostly as barrow inhumations under tumuli; some of these burials are secondary depositions into Yamnaya-era kurgans. Grave goods included pottery and stone battle-axes. There is some evidence of cremation in the northerly area. Settlements seem difficult to define; the economy was much like that of the Yamnaya and Corded Ware cultures, semi-to-fully-nomadic pastoralism.

Ethnicity
Within the context of the Kurgan hypothesis of Marija Gimbutas, this culture is a major center for migrations (or invasions, if one prefers) from the Yamnaya culture and its immediate successors into Northern and Central Europe.

It has been argued that the area where the Middle Dnieper culture is situated would have provided a better migration route for steppe tribes along the Pripyat tributary of the Dnieper and perhaps provided the cultural bridge between Yamnaya and Corded Ware cultures.  This area has also been a classic invasion route, as seen historically with the armies of the Mongol Golden Horde (moving east to west from the steppes) and Napoleon Bonaparte (moving west to east from Europe).  

On the other hand, the Middle-Dnieper culture has been viewed as a contact zone between Yamnaya steppe tribes and occupants of the forest steppe zone, possibly signaling communications between pre-Indo-Iranian speakers and pre-Balto-Slavs as interpreted by an exchange of material goods evident in the archaeological record sans migration.

See also

Sredny Stog culture
Milograd culture
Abashevo culture

References

Archaeological cultures of Eastern Europe
Indo-European archaeological cultures
Bronze Age cultures of Europe
Archaeological cultures in Belarus
Archaeological cultures in Ukraine
Corded Ware culture